West Airport or Airport West may refer to:

 Ireland West Airport
 Key West Airport
 Harriman-and-West Airport
 Branson West Airport
 Cincinnati West Airport
 West Kootenay Regional Airport
 West End Airport
 Virden West Airport
 West Auckland Airport
 West Ranch Airport
 West Woodward Airport
 West Memphis Municipal Airport
 West Sale Airport

See also 

 Airport West, Victoria
 List of airports in West Virginia